Annabelle Mary Cripps (born 16 February 1968) Olympian (1984 & 1988) / Author: Rescue Me: A Powerful Memoir By An Olympian, represented Great Britain at two consecutive Summer Olympics, starting in 1984. At her 1984 Summer Games Olympic debut in Los Angeles, she placed sixth in the women's 4×100-metre freestyle relay, followed by a 14th in the women's 800-metre freestyle and a 15th place in the 200-metre freestyle. four years later at the 1988 Summer Olympics in Seoul, South Korea.

She represented England and won two silver medals at the 1986 Commonwealth Games in Edinburgh, Scotland,  in the 4x100 metres and the 4x200 metres freestyle relay.

She is 14 times All-American honors swimmer at the University of Texas at Austin  participated on three consecutive NCAA Division I Women's Swimming and Diving Championships 1986, 1987, 1988.

In 2006, Annabelle Cripps changed her name to Katherine Starr. Katherine started Safe4Athletes in 2012 a non-profit dedicated to addressing sexual abuse in sport.  Published in the British Journal of Sports Medicine  - International Olympic Committee consensus statement: harassment and abuse (non-accidental violence) in sport

Katherine Starr is the author of the book published in 2022 - Rescue Me: A Powerful Memoir By An Olympian. Press Release for the book

Katherine is currently an Expert Witness for Athlete Sexual Abuse. Through her expertise, she has opined on over twenty cases with record-breaking settlements.

Swimming career
Cripps represented Great Britain at the 1984 and 1988 Summer Olympic Games. She represented England and won two silver medals in the 4 x 100 metres and 4 x 200 metres freestyle relay, at the 1986 Commonwealth Games in Edinburgh, Scotland.

References

 British Olympic Association athlete profile
 

1968 births
Living people
Commonwealth Games silver medallists for England
English female swimmers
Female butterfly swimmers
English female freestyle swimmers
Olympic swimmers of Great Britain
Sportspeople from Madison, Wisconsin
Swimmers at the 1984 Summer Olympics
Swimmers at the 1988 Summer Olympics
Swimmers at the 1986 Commonwealth Games
Texas Longhorns women's swimmers
Commonwealth Games medallists in swimming
Medallists at the 1986 Commonwealth Games